Novaya Chemrovka is a rural locality (a selo) and the administrative center of Novochemrovsky Selsoviet of Zonalny District, Altai Krai, Russia. The population was 2079 as of 2016. There are 28 streets.

Geography 
Novaya Chemrovka is located on the bank of the Chemrovka River, 17 km southeast of Zonalnoye (the district's administrative centre) by road. Mirny is the nearest rural locality.

Ethnicity 
The village is inhabited by Russians and others.

References 

Rural localities in Zonalny District